Dopahi, also known as Agrouli, is a village located in the eastern side of Ballia district in the Indian state of Uttar Pradesh.

References

Villages in Ballia district